James Benjamin Stanworth (20 July 1871 – 7 December 1955) was an Australian rules footballer who played with South Melbourne in the Victorian Football League (VFL).

Notes

External links 

1871 births
1955 deaths
Australian rules footballers from Tasmania
Sydney Swans players
Essendon Association Football Club players